Sedi is a township in Hongyuan County, Ngawa Tibetan and Qiang Autonomous Prefecture, Sichuan, China. In 2010, Sedi Township had a total population of 5,831: 2,870 males and 2,961 females: 1,507 aged under 14, 3,940 aged between 15 and 65 and 384 aged over 65.

References 
 

 

 
Township-level divisions of Sichuan
Ngawa Tibetan and Qiang Autonomous Prefecture